Catherine "Kitty" Beattie Toll (born August 8, 1959) is an American educator and politician. A former member of the Vermont House of Representatives, Toll was a candidate for lieutenant governor of Vermont in the 2022 election, and lost the Democratic nomination to David Zuckerman.

Early life and education 
Toll was born in Danville, Vermont, to Catherine and Harold Beattie. Her sister is Jane Kitchel. Her mother and sister served in the Vermont General Assembly. She received a Bachelor of Science degree from Lyndon State College in 1981 and a Master of Education from University of Vermont.

Career 
Prior to entering politics, Toll taught in the Vermont public school system. She served as a member of the Vermont House of Representatives for the Caledonia-Washington district from 2009 to 2021. During her tenure in the House, Toll served as chair of the House Appropriations. She is a Democrat.

Personal life 
Toll is married to Abel Toll and lives in Danville, Vermont. She has two children.

References

1959 births
Living people
People from Danville, Vermont
Lyndon State College alumni
University of Vermont alumni
Educators from Vermont
American women educators
Women state legislators in Vermont
Democratic Party members of the Vermont House of Representatives
21st-century American politicians
21st-century American women politicians